Dr. Michael Avi-Yonah (September 26, 1904 – March 26, 1974) was an Israeli archaeologist and historian. During his career he was a Professor of Archaeology at the Hebrew University of Jerusalem and served as secretary of Israel's Department of Antiquities.

Biography
Born in Lemberg, Austria-Hungary (today Lviv, Ukraine), Avi-Yonah moved to the Land of Israel with his parents in 1919 during the Third Aliyah. He first studied at Gymnasia Rehavia in Jerusalem, then he went to England and studied history and archeology at the University of London. Upon his return to the Land of Israel, he studied at the British School of Archaeology in Jerusalem. His first archaeological excavations were at Tel el-Ajjul near Gaza, and the Jerusalem Ophel. At the end of his studies, he joined the Department of Antiquities of the British government of Palestine. He worked as a librarian and archivist. After the independence of the state of Israel, he became secretary of the Department of Antiquities.

In 1949, he conducted excavations at Givat Ram in Jerusalem during the construction of the International Convention Center, where he was the first to discover a brick factory of the Legio X Fretensis. He participated in the first survey that preceded the Masada excavations, and conducted a limited excavation north of Caesarea Maritima where he discovered an ancient synagogue.

He was awarded the Bialik Prize in 1955 for his book Antiquities of our land.

Avi-Yonah died in Jerusalem in 1974.

Selected bibliography
 Encyclopedia of Archaeological Excavations in the Holy Land
 Jerusalem the Holy
 The Art of Mosaics (cowritten with Richard L. Currier)
 Holy Land
 Ancient Scrolls
 History of Israel and the Holy Land
 Views of the Biblical World. Jerusalem: International Publishing Company J-m Ltd, 1959.
 
 Macmillan Bible Atlas with Yohanan Aharoni (1993)
 ''Understanding the Bible: Understanding the Maccabean Revolt, 167 to 63 BCE: An Introductory Atlas. Co-author: Shmuel Safrai. Carta Jerusalem. 2019

See also
Holyland Model of Jerusalem, designed by Avi-Yonah

References

1904 births
1974 deaths
People from the Kingdom of Galicia and Lodomeria
Austro-Hungarian Jews
Polish emigrants to Mandatory Palestine
Israeli archaeologists
Israeli librarians
Historical geography
Alumni of the University of London
Academic staff of the Hebrew University of Jerusalem
20th-century archaeologists
20th-century Israeli historians
Palestinologists